Central Stadium is a football-specific stadium in Gomel, Belarus. It is currently used as a home ground of Gomel. The stadium is all-seater and  has a capacity of 14,307 people. The stadium was opened in 2004.

History
The modern stadium was built at the site of an old multi-purpose stadium of the same name, which was built in the 1930s and used by Gomel until 1999. The stadium was then demolished and completely rebuilt during 1999–2004.

International use
The stadium has been used by Gomel in international (mainly UEFA Europa League) matches. It was also used as a home ground for Belarus national football team on one occasion, which was a UEFA Euro 2008 qualifying match against Luxembourg in October 2007 that ended with 0–1 loss for the home team.

References

External links
World Stadium Article
Profile at pressball.by
Stadium profile at the FC Gomel official site

Football venues in Belarus
Sport in Gomel
Buildings and structures in Gomel Region
FC Gomel